Telford Parliamentary church also known as the Telford Kirks are a series of presbyterian churches in Scotland built with money voted from the parliament of the United Kingdom as a result of the Church of Scotland Act 1824 for a grant of £50,000, designed by the surveyor William Thomson and built by the Scottish stonemason and architect Thomas Telford. In total, 32 churches were built and many are still in use today. Others have been abandoned, e.g. at Stoer, while others were destroyed and rebuilt, e.g. at Tobermory, while others have been converted to dwellings.

History
At the beginning of the 19th century, the provision of churches in the whole of Britain, and in the Highlands in particular, no longer matched the spiritual and religious requirements of the population. Most Highland parishes were large areas of rough mountainous land, and many parishioners, especially those who had been cleared from the land, or who lived in one of the new villages that were coming into existence around that time, lived so far from the parish kirk that they could not attend worship regularly, which was seen as a bad thing. Besides gaps in the provision by the Church of Scotland, there were also pockets of other religious denominations, including Roman Catholic and a variety of minor sects, which were seen as undesirable by the Church of Scotland and by the government.

After the Napoleonic Wars, Parliament made available £1,000,000 in 1819, with a further £500,000 in 1824, for the building of churches and chapels for the Church of England, as an expression of gratitude to God for victory. 214 "Commissioners' Churches" were built or refurbished; one of these alone is said to have cost the best part of £77,000 (equivalent to £6 million in 2014), though much of this was not government money.

A similar proposal to provide £200,000 for the Church of Scotland was delayed for years by various political difficulties and obstruction, and when an amended Bill was eventually passed in 1824, it provided just £50,000 for the whole of the Highlands. No more than 30 kirks with manses were to be built, and no more than £1500 (equivalent to £125,000 in 2014) was to be spent on any one site. A similar Bill for the Lowlands failed altogether in 1825. So the whole of Scotland got a Parliamentary grant of less than was spent on one single Church of England building; and the majority of parishes, and parishioners, in Scotland got nothing at all.

The task of selecting the sites and overseeing the work was entrusted to the Commissioners for Building Highland Roads and Bridges, and in particular to their Chief Surveyor Thomas Telford. The Bill required that the heritors,  should apply for a new kirk to be built on land that they would make available, and in August 1825 the Commissioners considered 78 applications; eighteen more were received by June 1826, and eventually, and not without difficulty, sites were chosen for 32 kirks and 41 manses, the extra manses to be provided where there was already a kirk, but no manse.

Design
Between 1823 and 1830, Telford was responsible for the management of construction of the highland churches northwards from Islay to the Shetland. In the year between 1823 and 1824 he prepared estimates, plans and specifications for a standardised structure that was based on one submitted proposal of his three surveyors, James Smith, Joseph Mitchell and William Thomson. Thomson had asked his three surveyors to submit designs for a kirk and manse with a specific budget and caveat that the kirk had to be constructed in a manner that would resist a stormy climate. The eventual plans that were adopted came from William Thomson and considered austere in design.

The layout of each church followed a simple rectangular or a T-plan design each with small belfry. In a rectangular design the tall lattice windows are located in the side walls. For the T-plan, an extension was built at the rear with the lattice windows are on the side walls. The standardised windows design was used so that they could be supplied ready made by James Abernethy of Aberdeen. Original window frames survive in several churches e.g. in Croick, Iona and Ullapool. The doors also standardised, used four-centred arches for support.

List of churches by location

References

External links
 The Parliamentary Churches
 Thomas Telford Parliamentary Church
 Stoer Parliamentary Church
 Thomas Telford's Parliamentary Churches

Churches in Scotland
Works of Thomas Telford
19th century in Scotland